Wutthakat BTS station is a BTS skytrain station, on the Silom Line at Thon Buri and Chom Thong District boundary, Bangkok, Thailand. The station is located on Ratchaphruek Road over Dan canal. It is surrounded by residences, small shops and office towers.

The station opened on 5 December 2013.

References

See also
 Bangkok Skytrain

BTS Skytrain stations
Railway stations opened in 2013
SRT Red Lines